Brownsville, Illinois may refer to the following places in Illinois:
Brownsville, Jackson County, Illinois, a ghost town
Brownsville, White County, Illinois, an unincorporated community